The 2018–19 NBL Canada season is the eighth season of the National Basketball League of Canada. The regular season ran from November 15, 2018, to March 31, 2019.

League changes
The league originally intended to move the St. John's Edge to the Atlantic Division following the addition of the expansion Sudbury Five. However, after the NBL lost the Niagara River Lions and was back to four teams in Ontario, the league decided to play as a single table for the regular season schedule to ease the Edge's travel. The league still uses each team's overall record in a divisional table for playoff qualification as done in previous seasons.

Offseason coaching changes 
 The Cape Breton Highlanders hired Bernardo Fitz-Gonzalez, a former Colombia national basketball team player, after former coach Rob Spon left the team after one season.
The St. John's Edge hired Doug Plumb after former coach Jeff Dunlap left to become an assistant at California State University, Northridge.
The Sudbury Five hired Logan Stutz as its inaugural head coach and general manager.

Midseason coaching changes
The London Lightning fired Keith Vassell following a 4–4 start to the season after leading the team to a championship the previous season. He was replaced by Elliott Etherington.
The St. John's Edge head coach Doug Plumb resigned in March 2019 and was replaced by assistant Steven Marcus as interim head coach.

Regular season 
Standings as of 31 March 2019:

Notes
z – Clinched home court advantage for the entire playoffs
c – Clinched home court advantage for the division playoffs
x – Clinched playoff spot

Attendance
As of the end of the regular season

Playoffs

Bold Series winner
Italic Team with home-court advantage

Statistics

As of games played 31 March 2019

Individual statistic leaders

Individual game highs

Awards

Player of the Week award

Coach of the Month award

End-of-season awards
Source:
Most Valuable Player: Braylon Rayson, Sudbury Five
Canadian Player of the Year: Guillaume Boucard, Island Storm
Newcomer of the Year: Jaylen Bland, Sudbury Five
Defensive Player of the Year: Rhamel Brown, Halifax Hurricanes
Rookie of the Year: Frank Bartley, Saint John Riptide
Sixth Man of the Year: Jamal Reynolds, Cape Breton Highlanders
Most Improved Player of the Year: Junior Cadougan, St. John's Edge
Coach of the Year: Joe Salerno, Moncton Magic

Draft
The 2018–19 NBL Canada Draft and Combine was held on August 25–26.

References

External links
NBL Canada website

 
National Basketball League of Canada seasons
2018–19 in Canadian basketball